James Lyons (October 8, 1960 – April 12, 2007) was an American film editor, screenwriter and actor who frequently collaborated with Todd Haynes. He is probably best known for editing The Virgin Suicides and editing and co-writing Velvet Goldmine. He also had a minor role in the 1996 film I Shot Andy Warhol as Billy Name.

Filmography as editor
 Poison (1991)
 The Debt (1993)
 Late Fall (1994)
 Safe (1995)
 Ratchet (1996)
 Strawberry Fields (1997)
 Shooting Porn (1997)
 First Love, Last Rites (1997)
 Velvet Goldmine (1998)
 The Virgin Suicides (1999)
 Spring Forward (1999)
 The Château (2001)
 Prozac Nation (2001)
 Far from Heaven (2002)
 Ghostlight (2003)
 Imaginary Heroes (2004)
 A Walk Into the Sea: Danny Williams and the Warhol Factory (2007)

Personal life
Lyons was involved in a long-term relationship with filmmaker Todd Haynes.

Death
He died in Manhattan of squamous cell carcinoma, at the age of 46, after more than a decade of treatment for HIV.

References

Further reading
 Following a short obituary, this article reproduces several remembrances of Lyons.

External links
 

1960 births
2007 deaths
American male actors
American film editors
AIDS-related deaths in New York (state)
Deaths from cancer in New York (state)
Deaths from squamous cell carcinoma of skin
LGBT people from New York (state)
20th-century American screenwriters
20th-century American LGBT people